William Bowyer may refer to:

Politicians
William Bowyer (15th century MP), in 1411 MP for Newcastle-under-Lyme
William Bowyer (died 1602), MP for Stafford
William Bowyer (Keeper of the Records), MP for Westminster and Keeper of the Records in the Tower
William Bowyer (died 1616), MP for Carlisle, Dunheved and Appleby
William Bowyer (MP) (–1641), MP for Staffordshire
Sir William Bowyer, 1st Baronet (1612–1679), English MP for Buckinghamshire

Others
William Bowyer (1663–1737), British printer
William Bowyer (printer) (1699–1777), his son, British printer
William Bowyer (artist) (1926–2015), British portrait and landscape painter

See also
 Sir William Bowyer-Smijth, 11th Baronet (1814–1883), British MP for South Essex
 Bowyer (surname)